Kirill Sergeyevich Prokopev (born 30 January 1994) is a Russian artistic gymnast. He is a two-time gold medalist at the Summer Universiade. He won the gold medal in the floor event at the 2017 Summer Universiade and he won the bronze medal in the men's team all-around event. This repeated itself at the 2019 Summer Universiade with gold in the floor event and bronze in the team event.

At the 2012 European Men's Artistic Gymnastics Championships held in Montpellier, France, he won the gold medal in the junior floor event.

In 2020, he won the silver medal in the floor exercise in Melbourne, Australia as part of the 2020 FIG Artistic Gymnastics World Cup series. He repeated this in the competition held in Baku, Azerbaijan.

References

External links 
 

Living people
1994 births
People from Vladimir, Russia
Russian male artistic gymnasts
Universiade medalists in gymnastics
Universiade gold medalists for Russia
Universiade bronze medalists for Russia
Medalists at the 2017 Summer Universiade
Medalists at the 2019 Summer Universiade
Sportspeople from Vladimir Oblast
21st-century Russian people